Samsung Galaxy J5 plus is an Android smartphone produced by Samsung Electronics. It was announced and released in June 2017. It has an advanced 64-bit system on a chip and 1.5 GB RAM. The CPU is a Snapdragon 410.

The Galaxy J5 plus has a 16megapixels rear camera with LED flash, f/1.9 aperture, auto-focus and an 8megapixels wide-angle front facing camera which can extend up to 120°, also equipped with LED flash.

References

J5 Plus